Behind the Water is a 2016 Latin American televised drama documentary based on the live interactions within the world water crisis. Fraser Kershaw stars in the film. The film captures live footage while combining fictional elements. The film embraces the power of family and the commitment to conflict for survival. The film is based on a true story and throughout the film Kershaw transitions into various characters seen in his subconscious.

Filming
The footage within the film was collected over 2 years throughout Latin America. Lacking access to modern health care in the jungle added stress to the film's production. Fraser Kershaw takes a camera crew through highly restricted areas to find the deeply personal tales of stories from locals of Latin America. Kershaw can be seen delivering clean water in rural restricted areas.

Plot
The film is based in part on some fiction, which itself is based in three separate adventures in the mind of Kershaw. He is seen as multiple characters.  The film weaves together the stirring true stories of individuals who have overcome devastating obstacles to find clean water. The film embraces the power of family, commitment and how a community can be radically divided because of survival.

Music
The original score was composed by Brent Kutzle and Fraser Kershaw. Behind the Water's soundtrack was released on April 23, 2016.
Caribbean's Cana News states, "The score is clever enough to enhance the visions into place which assimilates to the footage from beginning to end."

Release
Behind the Water was released on International television during Earth Day weekend throughout the Caribbean and Latin America. Kershaw intends to bring the film alive in real time to public universities.

References

External links
 
 

2016 television films
2016 films
2016 biographical drama films
American biographical drama films
Hispanic and Latino American drama films
2010s English-language films
2010s American films